Diakhaté or Diakhate is a surname. Notable people with the surname include:

Adama Diakhaté (born 1970), Senegalese basketball player
Lamine Diakhate (1928–1987), Senegalese writer and diplomat
Ndèye Coumba Mbengue Diakhaté (1924–2001), Senegalese educator and poet
Pape Diakhaté (born 1984), Senegalese footballer
Pape Moussa Diakhatè (born 1989), Senegalese footballer